Marouf is a surname. Notable people with the surname include:

Saeid Marouf (born 1985), Iranian volleyball player
Soulieman Marouf (born 1972), British businessman
Taha Muhie-eldin Marouf (1924–2009), Iraqi politician

See also
Marouf (given name)